Marko Marić (born 25 April 1983) is a Croatian former professional footballer who last worked as an assistant manager of Dinamo Zagreb.

Playing career

Europe
Born in Zagreb, Marić began his career with Croatia's NK Zagreb and in two years at the club appeared in 35 league matches. In 2005, he joined Greek First Division side Egaleo FC. In two years in Greece Marić appeared in 41 league matches and scored one goal. His play with Egaleo FC did not go unnoticed and Marić started to receive interest from higher level clubs.

In the summer of 2007 he signed a three-year contract with France's Lille OSC. In two years at the club Marić received limited playing time making five league appearances and scoring one goal. On 29 January 2010 the Croatian midfielder left Lille and returned to Greece signing for Skoda Xanthi.

North America
On 2 March 2011, Marić signed with Chicago Fire of Major League Soccer. He made his debut for his new team on 14 April 2011 in a game against the Portland Timbers. That proved to be the only match Marić played for Chicago before suffering an injury and spending the remainder of season on the injured reserve.  Marić was eventually waived by the club on 14 September 2011.

Coaching career
On 13 March 2018, Marić was named assistant coach of Croatian team Dinamo Zagreb in staff of manager Nikola Jurčević.

References

External links

Profile at HNS

1983 births
Living people
Footballers from Zagreb
Association football midfielders
Croatian footballers
Croatia under-21 international footballers
NK Zagreb players
NK Marsonia players
Egaleo F.C. players
Lille OSC players
Xanthi F.C. players
Chicago Fire FC players
Croatian Football League players
Ligue 1 players
Super League Greece players
Major League Soccer players
Croatian expatriate footballers
Expatriate footballers in Greece
Croatian expatriate sportspeople in Greece
Expatriate footballers in France
Croatian expatriate sportspeople in France
Expatriate soccer players in the United States
Croatian expatriate sportspeople in the United States
GNK Dinamo Zagreb non-playing staff